The following highways are numbered 166:

Canada
Prince Edward Island Route 166

India
 National Highway 166 (India)

Japan
 Japan National Route 166

United States
 U.S. Route 166
 Alabama State Route 166
 Arizona State Route 166 (former)
 California State Route 166
 Connecticut Route 166
 Florida State Road 166 
 Georgia State Route 166
 Illinois Route 166
 Indiana State Road 166
 Kentucky Route 166
 Maine State Route 166
 Maine State Route 166A
 Maryland Route 166
 M-166 (Michigan highway)
 Nevada State Route 166 (former)
 New Jersey Route 166
 New Mexico State Road 166
 New York State Route 166
 Ohio State Route 166
 Oklahoma State Highway 166
 Pennsylvania Route 166
 Tennessee State Route 166 
 Texas State Highway 166
 Texas State Highway Loop 166
 Utah State Route 166 (former)
 Virginia State Route 166
 Washington State Route 166
 Wisconsin Highway 166 (former)
Territories
 Puerto Rico Highway 166